

B

References